Siamese describes something of or related to Siam (now called Thailand), or more specifically the region of Central Thailand, usually including Southern Thailand. 

Siamese may refer to:

Animals
Siamese cat, a domestic cat breed
Siamese crocodile, a species of crocodile
Siamese mud carp, a species of freshwater fish in the carp family, Cyprinidae
Siamese algae eater, a species of freshwater fish in the carp family, Cyprinidae
Siamese fighting fish, a species of fish from genus Betta
Siamese fireback, Lophura diardi, the national bird of Thailand
Siamese tigerfish, a species of fish from genus Datnioides, tiger perch

Other uses
 Conjoined twins or Siamese twins, identical twins joined in utero
 Chang and Eng Bunker, The "Siamese Twins", Siamese-American conjoined twin brothers from whom the term derives
 Siamese (band), formerly Siamese Fighting Fish, Danish rock and metal band
 Siamese connection or a splitter in fire protection engineering
 Siamese method, a mathematical method described by Simon de la Loubère
 Sukhothai language, a kind of Thai topolect, by the end of the 18th century, they gradually diverged into regional variants, which subsequently developed into the modern Central Thai and Southern Thai.
 Central Thai language or Siamese language, the sole official language of Thailand and first language of most people in Central Thailand and include Thai Chinese in Southern Thailand.
 Southern Thai language, or Southern Siamese language, or Tambralinga language, language of Southern Thailand first language of most people in Southern Thailand
 Thai people, Siamese people, Central/Southern Thai people or Thai noi people, an ethnic group from Central Thailand and Southern Thailand
 Khorat Thai, ethnic groups in Nakhon Ratchasima Province.
 Malaysian Siamese, ethnic groups in Northern Peninsular Malaysia.

See also

Siamese twins (disambiguation)
Siam (disambiguation)
Thai (disambiguation)

Language and nationality disambiguation pages